Monte Águila (Literally in english: "Mount Eagle") is a Chilean city in the Bio Bio Region. Its population is 6,574.

Toponymy 
According to the aboriginal account of the area that lived in the first half of the twentieth century, the name "Monte Águila" comes from the lonco Ñancomawida, whose name, in Mapudungun, meant "Mount of the Eagles" (in spanish: Monte de las águilas).

History

Origins 

The origins of this town cover a space of no more than 150 years, so much so that in his book, the Chilean historian Francisco Astaburuaga makes the first reference to the city, naming it as "Fundo Monte Águila". The history begins with the indigenous Mapuche and Araucanian people settled in the area of Monte Águila, belonging to the district (:es:subdelegación) of Yumbel. The first inhabitants of this town were a group of aboriginals of the Mapuche ethnic group, those who lived in the middle of the most sandy and deserted territories, with scarce vegetation, known for their ethnicity as Coyunches (in Mapuche language: People of the sands). These indigenous people were led by the lonco Ñancomawida, who, with their people, were not accepted in the farm that had been developed in the sector, as were the carpenters who worked there.

In 1852, this group of natives, was forced to leave the area as a result of legislation introduced by the government of Manuel Montt. This enabled the area to be colonized by German immigrants, led by Hans Frank and Martin Worman. There were several Mapuche uprisings, with the purpose of recovering their territories, with the purpose of recovering the stolen lands, from 1880 to 1882, and that is why Ñancomawida and its people were integrated into the progressive process of alienation of the land, in retaliation for the abuses and scarce committed by the new inhabitants. Later, the leader of that group of indigenous people, Ñancomawida, disappears, without knowing more about him.

Second half of the 19th century 

An important event in the development of Monte Águila was the construction of the state railway in 1864. After the War of the Pacific (1880), the town served as a transport hub from which weapons and future soldiers were transported in carts and rail cars. In 1887, a trade link was established between Monte Águila and the Argentine city of Neuquén, which lasted until 1968, a period in which Monte Águila saw much economic and social development. Also important to the growth of Monte Águila as a city was the construction of the branch line between it and the Polcura River. The trans-Andean railway, whose construction began in 1905, was funded by Porfirio Ahumada, a Chilean national, and his partners Corsini, Carlos Viel (engineer), Martin Worman and Horacio del Río. This was a key event in the formation of Monte Águila, enabling the city to come together and achieve rapid growth, bringing with it social and cultural development.

20th century 
As of 1979, the entire area located west of Río Claro passes to the administration of the Yumbel Commune, while the towns of Monte Águila, Charrúa, Chillancito and Salto del Laja are integrated into the commune of Cabrero, thus structuring the communicate as it is known today.

21st century 

Monte Águila is currently a growing city. In 2002 its population reached 6,090 inhabitants. A large part of the people who live in this town work as a farmer, or work in certain jobs in nearby cities, especially Los Angeles and Concepción, regional capital. At present, the railway industry is in disuse, and much of its structures have been abandoned, this because they are owned by Empresa de los Ferrocarriles del Estado, which prohibits the Municipality of Cabrero or any private entity from taking over these structures. Recently it has been used as a concert stage, and as a mini playground for children. The city has built new businesses and places of recreation, being one of the most remarkable remodeling of the main square of the city.

Geography 
The city is located in the Intermediate Depression, 19.67 km (12 mi) from the Ñuble-Biobío regional boundary. The altitude of the town is 115 m a.s.l.

Seismological phenomena 
Due to its location in the Pacific Ring of Fire, much of Chile has been affected by seismic natural disasters. Those that most affected the city were the earthquakes of 1960, and that of 2010, which caused a series of damages. Other catastrophes have affected the town recently, including a tornado in the nearby city of Los Angeles, and a large flood, due to heavy rainfall in July 2019.

Climate 
The town has a Mediterranean climate, with very marked seasons and dry and rainy periods of similar duration.

Politic and government

Administration 
In Chile, the commune is the smallest territorial subdivision, however, Monte Águila is not a commune, so it is subordinated to one, in this case, to the commune of Cabrero. Being part of Cabrero, they have the right to vote as citizens of the commune to choose their municipal authorities (1 mayor and 6 councilors), which are elected every four years. Since 2012, the mayor of Cabrero is Mario Gierke Quevedo, being originally from Monte Águila.

Historical evolution 
Until 1974, Chile is subdivided into provinces, departments, subdelegations and districts. During that time, Monte Águila belonged to the subdelegation of Yumbel. With the new administrative division, imposed by the dictatorial regime of Augusto Pinochet, Monte Águila remained as a suunity within the commune of Cabrero, being governed by a designated mayor until 1992, when at the end of the Military Dictatorship a municipal election was called. In 1992, when at the end of the military regime, the first mayor to return to democracy Hasan Sabag Castillo (DC), who was in office until 2012, was called to municipal elections.

City symbols 

 
The identity of the city of Monte Águila is closely linked to its historical past, and its origins. Despite lacking an official shield or flag, there are two very important elements in the culture of the city. One of them is the eagle, which comes from the same name of Monte Águila and its first inhabitants, mainly from Lonco Ñancomahuida, so this symbol can be recognized in different parts, such as in the mosaics of the main square, sports clubs , on the shield of institutions such as the "Orlando Vera Villarroel" Elementary School, etc. The other important element of the identity of Monte Águila is undoubtedly the train, and everything related to the railway industry, thanks to which the first village was born in the early twentieth century, and from which, after the decline of transport by train, only ruins and remains of what was that era. Proof of this are the series of references that exist in the city to this transport, such as mosaics in the main square, murals, artistic representations, sports clubs, neighborhood councils (in Chile, juntas de vecinos), etc.

The identity of the city has given its inhabitants the desire for greater independence and to constitute a separate community of Cabrero, which, until now, has not been so. During the administration of Mayor Hasan Sabag Castillo, many people from Monterrey expressed a certain disinterest on the part of the Municipality of Cabrero, feeling marginalized from municipal decisions by being in the background in their priority scale. At present, although the city has had a major advance in the last decade, this independence feeling still persists, being its main motivation the series of cultural and historical characteristics and elements that, for many of the citizens of the city, make it different from Cabrero, the main city.

Demography 
The historian Tito Figueroa argues that from the 1907 census, an official demographic statistic can be obtained for the town, at that time having 91 inhabitants. Undoubtedly, the "Ferrocarril del Sur", the construction of the railroad that connected Monte Águila with the Argentine province of Neuquén and the increase in the productivity of the farms in the area gave life to this urban nucleus. Proof of the above was its rapid population growth, reaching almost a thousand inhabitants in the 30s and doubling 30 years later. According to the 1992 census, at that time it had 5207 inhabitants, and later, according to the 2002 Census, Monte Águila had 6,090 inhabitants.

Distribution of population 
The population of Monte Águila is distributed homogeneously in its territory, divided into villas, highlighting the so-called "11 de septiembre, the most populous in the city. Monte Águila was formed under the principles of the grid plan, starting from the station to the east.

Religion 

Although the most recent Chilean census, carried out in 2017, did not investigate the religion of the population, the closest reference in this regard corresponds to the 2002 Census, which stated that in the Biobío Region, there were more than 1,000,000 Catholic Christians, more than 300,000 Protestant Christians, about 11,000 Jehovah's Witnesses, and an unimportant presence of Jews, Orthodoxs and Muslims. As for people who do not profess any religion (atheists and agnostics), the figure was more than 100,000 people.

These figures have undoubtedly changed during this time, which although it is not verified in figures, if it is corroborable in facts. Today there is a Catholic church in Monte Águila, the "Nuestra Señora del Carmen" Chapel, which dates back to the end of the 19th century, when Monte Águila was nothing more than a small farmhouse with very few houses, being at the beginning of wood , and after an accident that caused a fire that destroyed it, the current cement construction that persists until today was made.

It should also be noted the existence of several churches of the Protestant Christian cult of the Pentecostal branch.

Education

Culture and society

Heritage and monuments 
Most of the monuments of Monte Águila are located in the Main square, among which stand out a series of implements previously used in the railway industry, such as El Caballo de Agua and the Railroad Switch. Another one that has wanted to have is a train, which, being owned by the Empresa de los Ferrocarriles del Estado (EFE), has not been possible to install. However, its rails are installed in the Main square as another monument.

Other important to highlight is the monolith known as 'Piedra Bienvenido a Monte Águila (Spanish for 'Welcome to Monte Águila' Monolith), located on Zañartu street, which dates from the annual Semana Monteaguilina party in 1997.

 Cultural activities and entertainment 

Monte Águila has a series of traditional activities, which take place throughout the year. The most important are the following:

 El Verano Monteaguilino: El Verano Monteaguilino (spanish for Monteaguilean Summer or Monteaguilino Summer), also called Febrero Monteaguilino (spanish for Monteaguilean February or Monteaguilino February), by the date it is made, and formerly known as Semana Monteaguilina (spanish for Monteaguilean Week or Monteaguilino Week). Although the foundation date of Monte Águila is unknown until today, the city's anniversary is traditionally celebrated in February. Depending on the year, it can last a month or a week. In it, a series of artistic, sports and recreational disciplines are performed, in addition to inviting artists of national and international recognition and ends with a carnival night, where costumes, comparsas and handmade allegorical cars are exhibited. At the beginning it was carried out by the same community, but since 2011 it is carried out by the Municipality of Cabrero. The main events are usually held in three specific places, the Main Square, the Municipal Gym and the Sports Complex.
 Cruz de Mayo: This is the name given in Chile to the renowned Hispanic party Cruz de Mayo (spanish for May Cross), very common in Latin American countries. It is the typical celebration of one of the festivals within the Roman rite to celebrate the cult of the Cross of Christ, which in Chile is celebrated with a series of typical and own elements, such as the traditional song "Here goes the Cruz de Mayo, visiting his devotees with a little candle and a little wort ", with which money is raised for those in need. Although the date according to the Roman rite is May 3, the first weekend of that month is usually celebrated in Monte Águila. It has a varied sample of typical Chilean elements, such as gastronomy, crafts and folk dances.
 Fiestas Patrias: Also popularly known as "El Dieciocho" (spanish for The Eighteen) for the date it takes place, corresponds to the holiday that highlights the customs and traditions typical of national identity and is one of the most popular celebrations in Chile. In Monte Águila in these dates many activities of their own are usually done, among which are: "Mil Pañuelos al viento", an activity where students from schools, teachers, and members of various institutions, dance several caves in the street with clothing typical Chilean; a parade and civic act of the main institutions of the city on September 17; and the traditional branches, which are always carried out in the city's Sports Complex.

 Education 
There are public and private educational establishments, which teach from primary education to secondary education.

 Public schools 

 Primary schools 

 "Orlando Vera Villarroel" Elementary School.

 High schools 

 "Politécnico Bicentenario de Monte Águila" High School.

 Private schools 

 Primary schools 

 "Monte Águila College" Elementary School.
 "Abel Inostroza Gutiérrez" Elementary School.
 "Esperanza" Elementary School.

 Prominent figures 

José Sepúlveda, "El Monteaguilino", Chilean folklorist.
 Edgardo Abdala, former football player and current Palestinian-Chilean coach.
 Luis Chavarria, former Chilean football player who played internationally with the Chile national football team.
 Raúl Caces Torres, Chilean painter, politician and historian.
 Mario Gierke Quevedo, Chilean politician. Current Mayor of Cabrero.
 Anwar Farrán Veloso, Chilean television journalist. He has worked for TVN and Mega networks.
 Enrique Edwards Orrego (†), Chilean businessman and politician.

 Sports 

 Sports disciplines 

 Association football 
In Monte Águila the most popular sport is football, which is mainly reflected in the existence of two clubs in the city “Ferroviarios de Chile” and “El Águila”, rival teams that play in the local football association to which they belong , which is the Bio-Bio Association (Yumbel) within the Asociación Nacional de Fútbol Amateur ANFA. Both teams exercise locality in the Municipal Stadium of Monte Águila. These football clubs are characterized by being social venues recognized for their work in the city, being an important part in their development, both social and sports.

It should also be noted that Monte Águila has been the city of origin for soccer players such as Edgardo Abdala, Justo Farrán and Luis Chavarría.

 In Line Skate 
Monte Águila has been during the last years an important roller practice center, having its own club called “Roller Monte Águila”, where its members range between 3 and 30 years of age, and they practice today in the Cabrero Patinadrome, although there are plans for the construction of one in Monte Águila.

 Motoring 
During the Fiestas Patrias, amateur car racing competitions, called piques ¼ de milla, are also held during the National Holidays period. These used to be done on land, in the street next to the state, but currently the street is paved.

The practice of this discipline has been criticized, given that the city does not have the necessary security to practice this sport. This would be demonstrated last September 2019, when during that competition an accident occurred that caused four injured.

 Sports venues 

 Monte Águila Municipal Gym 

On Carlos Viel Street, next to the annex of the Orlando Vera Elementary School, is the Municipal Gym of Monte Águila, a multipurpose public venue, which is mostly used for sports activities, mainly in-line skate, basketball and other varied sports disciplines.

On September 15 and 16, 2018, the gym hosted an international roller or inline skate championship called “Freestyle Competition”, which was attended by leading national and international skaters.

The gym is usually also used for artistic shows, such as Folk Shows (mainly in September), recreational shows and concerts, the latter especially as a framework for celebrations such as the Verano Monteaguilino.

 Monte Águila football stadium 

Monte Águila has its own stadium, which is located northwest of the city. For a while, it remained neglected, which led to it being remodeled and reopened in 2016, which proceeded to replace the natural grass with synthetic grass, and completely change the stadium, which received the FIFA certification.

Football is mainly played at the stadium, and the two local teams of the ANFA play locality: “Ferroviarios” and “El Águila”, rival teams that play in the local football association to which they belong, which is the Bio- Bio Association (Yumbel). The Cabrerino team of the Tercera División B of Chile, "Comunal Cabrero", occasionally exercises locality in the same stadium.

 Sports Complex 
Municipal enclosure located steps from the stadium. It also usually do sports activities occasionally. It includes extensive grounds, in addition to its own gym. In recent times, this venue is occupied mainly for things outside the sport itself, such as events, such as La Cruz de Mayo or Ramadas, in Fiestas Patrias.

 Media 
In Monte Águila, at present, several communication services are available, from public telephones to wireless broadband networks. Fixed telephony, whose telephone code is 43 (same as Los Ángeles City), has coverage for all of Monte Águila's homes through the companies Movistar Chile, Claro Chile, and Entel Chile, while mobile telephony (In charge of Movistar Chile, Entel, VTR Mobile, WOM and Claro Chile) has had a great growth during the 2000s. Similarly, internet services have expanded significantly during the same decade, the internet being more common in homes, in contrast to the past, where it was more common to access this service in Internet cafes, which are now almost nonexistent in the city. In Monte Águila, most of the nationwide open-air television channels are received through an antenna, with the exception of TV+ and Telecanal. This coverage has evolved over the years, since until the early 1990s, only Televisión Nacional de Chile and Canal 13 could be tuned in, channels such as Mega, Chilevisión and La Red arriving later. Equally important is the mention of Canal 9 Biobío Television (traditionally known as the Regional Channel), which broadcasts from the regional capital Concepción. The city also currently has two local television channels. Canal 11 Television and TVC Mi Canal, both cable television channels with communal coverage. In addition, institutions such as the Abel Inostroza Gutiérrez Elementary School and the Orlando Vera Villarroel Elementary School have been pioneers in the transmission of television content made by the students of the establishments themselves, with the help of professors and academics.

There are also pay-TV services, being the most dominant in Monte Águila the companies Mundo Pacífico and TV Cable del Sur. The available television channels, both national and local, are described below:

 TV channels 

 VHF 

 National TV channels 

 3 La Red.
 6 TVN.
 7 Canal 9 Bío-Bío Televisión.
 9 Mega.
 11 Chilevisión.
 13 Canal 13.

 Other channels 

 2 Nuevo Tiempo

 Cable TV 

 Local TV channels 

 4 TVC Mi Canal (Cabrero) .
 10 Juntos TV (Yumbel).
 11' Canal 11 Televisión (Monte Águila).

Gallery

See also

References

External links 
 Monte Aguila - official site

Populated places in Bío Bío Province